Chilomycterus spinosus, sometimes known as the brown burrfish, is a species of burrfish in the family Diodontidae. It is native to the southwestern Atlantic Ocean, where it ranges from Venezuela to Argentina, including the island of Trinidad. It is known to occur in both marine and brackish environments, where it is typically found at a depth of 70 to 190 m (230 to 623 ft). The species reaches 28 cm (11 inches) in total length and can weigh up to at least 12.21 grams.

Although Chilomycterus mauretanicus, native to the eastern Atlantic, has historically been classified as a subspecies of C. spinosus, it is now considered by multiple sources to constitute a distinct and valid species.

References 

spinosus
Fish described in 1758
Fish of the Atlantic Ocean